Skyworth Auto is a Chinese manufacturer of electric passenger vehicles based in Nanjing, and operating since 2017. The brand belongs to Chinese company Skywell, in partnership with Skyworth Group.

History

Skywell New Energy 
In 2017, Skywell, owner of Nanjing Golden Dragon Bus, announced an expansion into passenger vehicles. 'Skywell New Energy' was created with this goal as a subsidiary. 

In the same year, development work began on the first electric car at the research and development center in Nanjing.

In 2020, Skywell's electric car development division officially introduced the Skywell ET5  as its first vehicle, to be manufactured by Tianmei Automobile.

Skyworth Auto 
In April 2021, the division was renamed Skyworth Auto to distinguish it from parent Skywell. Initially, the name change did not include the Skywell ET5 itself, however in July 2021 the vehicle itself received both a new marque and destination, as the Skyworth EV6. 

In 2021, German company Elaris announced it would be distributing the EV6 locally as the Elaris Beo.

Imperium Motors also announced it would be bringing the EV6 to the US and Canada the same year, as the ET5 Imperium.

Products

Current 
 Skyworth EV6

References

Car brands
Vehicle manufacturing companies established in 2020
Electric vehicle manufacturers of China